Goshen Church is a historic church on Goshen Road in Bradford, Vermont.  Built in 1834, it is a fine and little-altered example of vernacular Greek Revival architecture in a rural setting.  It was listed on the National Register of Historic Places in 1976.

Description and history
The Goshen Church is located in a rural upland area of western Bradford, on the east side of Goshen Road a short way south of its junction with Upper Rogers Road.  It is a single-story wood-frame structure, with a gabled roof and clapboarded exterior.  Its front facade is symmetrical, with two identical entrances, each framed by sidelight windows and topped by a triple tympanum with a central Gothic louver flanked by smaller similar ones.  Above each entry is a sash window, also topped by a Gothic louver, and a similar opening, now sided over, is set in the gable end.  A two-stage square tower rises from the roof ridge, with a plain first stage, and a smaller second belfry stage with rectangular louvered openings.  The tower is topped by a railing with corner pinnacles.  The interior retains original box pews and pulpit, the latter finished in a simulation of marble.

The church congregation was founded in the early 19th century, by citizens of Bradford and Newbury who had broken from more strongly Calvinist Baptist congregations.  The location of their church, in Bradford near the town line with Newbury, was chosen as a convenience to its parishioners.  The building has never been fitted with modern amenities such as electricity, and is now used for services only in the summertime.

See also
National Register of Historic Places listings in Orange County, Vermont

References

Churches on the National Register of Historic Places in Vermont
Churches completed in 1834
19th-century churches in the United States
Buildings and structures in Bradford, Vermont
Churches in Orange County, Vermont
National Register of Historic Places in Orange County, Vermont
1834 establishments in Vermont